The Baby Pact, also known asThe Wedding Pact 2, is a 2021 American film written and directed by Matt Berman. It is a sequel to the 2014 film The Wedding Pact. It stars Haylie Duff as Elizabeth Carter, a pregnant widow who moves back to her hometown after the death of her husband. The film was shot in Fort Wayne, Indiana. It held a premiere in November 2021 and was released in the United States on June 14, 2022.

Premise
Elizabeth's husband Mitch dies after three years of marriage. A pregnant Elizabeth moves back to her hometown to start a new life but her mother-in-law arrives seeking custody of her baby believing it is what her son wanted.

Cast

Production
Following two delays caused by the COVID-19 pandemic, the film was announced in March 2021 when it was revealed production would take place in Los Angeles, California and Fort Wayne, Indiana. In May 2021, it was reported that principal photography had begun in areas around California, including L.A. and Orange County. Filming moved to Fort Wayne on May 22 for five days before concluding on May 26, 2021. On the location choice, Matt Berman explained that his decision was based on a dinner he had with Fort Wayne Architect Michael Gouloff, where Berman said he wanted to film it in L.A. and his wife responded by saying, "You need to make the movie in Fort Wayne, Indiana."

Release
The film premiered in Fort Wayne on November 12, 2021.

References

External links
 

American comedy films
American sequel films
2021 films
Films postponed due to the COVID-19 pandemic
2020s English-language films
2020s American films